The Man is a slang phrase, used to refer to a generalized idea of authority.

The Man may also refer to:

Literature 
 The Man (Stoker novel), a 1905 novel by Bram Stoker
 The Man (Wallace novel), a 1964 novel by Irving Wallace
 The Man (comics) (1992), a graphic novel by Raymond Briggs
 "The Man", a 1951 short story in The Illustrated Man by Ray Bradbury

Music 
 The Man (Barry White album), 1978
 The Man (Bill Drummond album), 1986
 The Man (Sponge album), 2005
 The Man (Lorne Greene album), 1965
 The Man!, album by Leroy Hutson

Songs
 "The Man" (Aloe Blacc song), 2014
 "The Man" (Ed Sheeran song), 2014
"The Man" (The Killers song), 2017
"The Man" (Taylor Swift song), 2019
 "The Man", a song by Patto from their 1970 album Patto
 "The Man", a duet between Paul McCartney and Michael Jackson from McCartney's 1983 album Pipes of Peace
 "The Man", a song by Eels from their 2010 album Tomorrow Morning
"The Man", a 2018 song by Goat Girl

Films 
 The Man (1972 film), starring James Earl Jones, based upon Irving Wallace's novel
 The Man (2005 film), starring Samuel L. Jackson and Eugene Levy

Television 
 "The Man", a 2019 episode of One Day at a Time
 Irina Derevko, a character in the 2001–2006 series Alias, played by Lena Olin
 Ed Brown, eponymous character in the 1974–1978 series Chico and the Man, played by Jack Albertson

People
 Stan Musial (1920–2013), professional baseball player nicknamed "Stan the Man"
 Stan Lee (1922–2018), legendary comic book creator nicknamed "Stan the Man"
 Ric Flair (born 1949), retired American professional wrestler whose catchphrases included, "To be 'the man', you gotta beat the man!"
 The Man, a later stage name used briefly by former American professional wrestler Big Boss Man (Ray Traylor, 1963–2004)
 Anthony Mundine (born 1975), Australian boxer and former rugby player nicknamed "The Man"
 Becky Lynch (born 1987), Irish professional wrestler nicknamed "The Man"
 Van Morrisson, Irish musician nicknamed "Van The Man”

See also
 Man (disambiguation)
 Men (disambiguation)
 I'm the Man (disambiguation)
 Stan the Man (nickname)
 The Men (disambiguation)